Alejandro Tarik Agag Longo (born 18 September 1970, in Madrid) is a Spanish businessman and former politician. He is based in London as the Chairman of Addax Capital LLP.

Early life and education
Born to an Algerian-Belgian father Youssef Agag, who was a banker, and a Spanish mother, Soledad Longo Álvarez de Soto Mayor, Agag enjoyed an international upbringing in Madrid, including primary and secondary schooling at the Colegio Retamar, Pozuelo de Alarcón, a fee-paying school belonging to the Opus Dei, a Catholic movement, Paris and New York. Agag graduated with a degree in Economics and Business studies from the Colegio Universitario de Estudios Financieros (CUNEF) in Madrid, a private entity financed by the Spanish banks, and is fluent in four languages, Spanish, English, French and Italian.

Political career
Agag's political career began when, at the early age of 18, he became a member of Nuevas Generaciones (NNGG), the youth organization of the main center-right Spanish party Partido Popular, which at the time was in the opposition. Having been actively involved in politics while at University, he quickly moved up the ranks of the youth structure of the party, joining, due to his knowledge of languages, the international relations department.

During that time Agag travelled extensively representing NNGG in organizations such as DEMYC and EYCD, center-right parties from Europe and the world that brought together youth political branches. Agag was elected International Secretary of NNGG at their congress in 1994.

In the same year, Agag graduated in economics and was offered the position of Deputy Secretary General of the European People's Party. An offer that was as a direct result of the election – a few months earlier – of the German Klaus Welle as secretary general. Welle and Agag met in the youth organizations level, and Welle took Agag with him to the EPP – Agag was 23 at the time. That year, Agag also ran for a seat in the European Parliament, he campaigned in towns and villages in Extremadura; he was not elected at this time.

As deputy secretary general, Agag was in charge of coordinating the different policy working groups within the EPP, and drafting of policy papers to be presented at the congress. As DSG Agag was a member of the EPP Summit, which meets before the European Council meetings and includes all of EPP's Heads of State and Government.

In 1996 the Center-right won the elections in Spain, and Agag was offered the position to become designated aid of the President of the Government, José María Aznar. The President had three aides, one diplomat, one military and one political (Agag). He was 25 at the time, and spent three years in that position.

In 1999, at 28 years of age, he was elected a Member of the European Parliament (MEP) for the Partido Popular. He entered the Economic and Monetary affairs commission, focusing in antitrust policy. In 2000 he led the Parliaments report on antitrust policy, and was active in redrafting the present antitrust rules.

 
Earlier that year he had also been elected Secretary General of the European People's Party, replacing his colleague Klaus Welle. During his mandate as SG the organization expanded to the east of Europe, during that period it incorporated more than 20 new political parties from the region. Later that year, for the first time, the EPP won the European Parliament elections and became the largest political force in Europe.

Agag was also very active in Italy. Making a controversial decision, and against some member parties within the organization, he pushed for the acceptance of Forza Italia, Silvio Berlusconi's party, into the EPP. This was of help to Berlusconi, who went on to win the elections in Italy in 2001. That year Agag intervened in the closing campaign rally of Forza Italia in Rome.

In 2000 Agag was elected in Mexico Secretary General of the Christian Democratic International, renamed at that meeting Centrist Democratic International. This global political organization has over 90 member parties from all over the world.

In 2001, Agag made a decision to cease his political activities in order to furtherance a career in business and sporting activities. The following year he was succeeded at the EPP by an old fellow during his times with Aznar: Antonio López-Istúriz. He remained a member of the European Parliament until 2002.

Business career

In 2002 Agag moved to London and started his own consultancy firm. He has been very active in multiple fields, including telecoms, energy, and especially media. Agag expanded his activities to financial advisory and fund management, forming a company called Addax Capital LLP, which is regulated by the FSA. Agag is currently Chairman of Addax and was joined in 2009 by Ignacio Muñoz Alonso, former CEO of Rothschild Bank in Spain, who worked for Lehman Brothers before that.

In 2007, the Financial Times named him as one of the 10 "shakers and movers" of the Spanish economy, and he was described as a "political hopeful, economist, banker and indefatigable dealmaker".

Agag is frequently mentioned in the media for his extensive range of contacts, both political and business, from all over the world. The Spanish newspaper 'El Pais' once described his Nokia SIM Card as "Priceless".

In 2008, GQ Magazine elected him as the Spanish "Businessman of the Year."

Sports: Formula 1, Formula E, GP2 and football

Agag business activity within sports mainly focuses on motorsport and football. According to the Spanish newspaper 'El Pais', Agag, together with Flavio Briatore, acquired very early on the Formula One T.V. rights for Spain. This was achieved via a U.K. based company and played a key role in the huge expansion of Formula One in Spain where television audiences have multiplied over the past few years. Agag is also very heavily involved in the 'sponsorship' side of the business, he is said to be behind some of the major deals lately achieved in the sport.

Agag owned the Barwa Addax GP2 Series Team which won the title in 2008 and was runner-up in 2009. He took over the Team from former F1 driver, Adrián Campos, in mid-2007. The team's main sponsor is the Qatari real estate company, Barwa. Three drivers from Addax, Romain Grosjean, Vitaly Petrov and Lucas di Grassi, have made it to the F1. In 2010, Agag started competing in GP3 with the Addax GP3 Team.

Through his connection within sport, Agag has formed friendships with Flavio Briatore, Bernie Ecclestone and Lakshmi Mittal. Together, they bought the English football club Queens Park Rangers in 2007.

Agag served as chairman of QPR for a few months during the take-over then remained in the club as a shareholder. The plan was to have QPR promoted to the English Premier League, a feat that was achieved in 2011.

He is currently in charge of the Formula E Championship, an electric car racing series. The inaugural season began in September 2014 and lasted until June 2015. Formula E Holdings, whose CEO is Alejandro Agag, has set up races in ten different cities around the world which are Beijing, Putrajaya, Punta del Este, Buenos Aires, Miami, Long Beach, Monaco, Berlin, Moscow and London. The races take place in street circuits and began in Beijing on 13 September 2014.

Personal life
On 5 September 2002, Agag married Ana Aznar Botella, the daughter of then Prime Minister José María Aznar and politician Ana Botella, at El Escorial in Madrid. Guests included King Juan Carlos I and Queen Sofia of Spain. Former British Prime Minister Tony Blair and Italian Prime Minister Silvio Berlusconi served as witnesses.

Bibliography

References

1970 births
Living people
Businesspeople from Madrid
People's Party (Spain) politicians
Spanish people of Algerian descent
Politicians from Madrid
Auto racing executives
Formula E people
20th-century Spanish businesspeople
21st-century Spanish businesspeople
Spanish people of Belgian descent